Istanbul hosts a sizeable feral cat (Turkish: sokak kedisi, "street cat") population, with estimates ranging from a hundred thousand to over a million stray cats. Many Turkish citizens view street animals as communally-owned pets, rather than traditional strays, and the country has a blanket no-kill, no capture policy.

History 
According to Ayşe Sabuncu from Cats of Istanbul the wide prevalence of cats in the city can be connected back to Ottoman times. The vast majority of Istanbul's houses were made of wood, which gave shelter and enabled the proliferation of the mouse and rat populations. This made cats' presence a necessity in the city. Various media sources connected the positive attitude towards cats in Turkey to Islam (see Islam and cats), the most prevalent faith in the country.

Health 

A 2011 study that examined tapeworm infections in stray animals of Istanbul found that 4.65% of the examined cats had Joyeuxiella pasqualei infections. Feline immunodeficiency virus and feline leukemia virus were found to be common among outdoor and stray cats. Although stray cats can be a vector for rabies, out of all 21 rabies cases in Turkey documented between 2000 and 2014 none were through a contact between cats and humans.

Public feeding of cats by the locals has been criticized by several veterinarians. A 2015 paper published by Rutgers University academics stated that collective feeding attracts and leads to concentration of animals to a specific area, which in turn facilitates the transmission of certain diseases. Healthy cats' contact with objects such as food and water containers that were contaminated by sick animals is another concern.

Law 

Before 2021 the Turkish law defined animals (strays and pets) as “commodities”, rather than "living beings". This classification was criticized by animal rights activists, as it led to perceived lenient penalties against animal cruelty. According to the proposition that was accepted in 2021, pets and stray animals were given "living being" status, which allows from six months up to four years jail sentences for crimes against animals. The law also mandates the sterilization of all stray animals in Turkey.

In 2019 a Japanese national was deported from Turkey after he admitted to killing and eating 5 stray cats in Küçükçekmece, which gained widespread outrage in both countries.

Cat life in Istanbul 
Istanbulites share the streets of the city with approximately 125,000 cats. Moreover, these are just stray cats alone; when house cats are included, it is estimated that an average of 200,000 cats live in this city. Cats are known to enjoy a very comfortable life in this city.

Generally, every street in Istanbul has cats that are familiar to locals. In these streets, tiny “cat houses” have been prepared for stray cats. Neighborhood residents place food and water containers in front of their houses to feed stray cats.

The Municipality of Istanbul has placed vending machines for cats & dogs in many parts of the city. There are quite a few cats around these vending machines. Citizens passing by put coins into these machines, ensuring that cats and dogs are fed.

Stray cats can be seen in many places in Istanbul, whether in university classrooms, on the ferry, on the bus seat, or on the subway, with no one bothering them.

In popular culture and media 
Feral cats of Istanbul have been represented in various media. Social media is noted to be a particular medium that Istanbul's cats gained popularity.

Critically acclaimed 2016 Turkish documentary film Kedi centers around several stray cats that live in the city. 's 2015 children's book Searching for a Cat in Istanbul (Japanese: イスタンブルで猫さがし) concerns with the search of a stray Turkish Van cat by students attending the Istanbul Japanese School. 

Tombili became internationally known due to a photograph that showing her reclining on the pavement, and after her death she was honored with a statue.

Gli was born in and raised in the Hagia Sophia, gaining the attention of visiting tourists.

Gallery

See also 

 Tombili
 Gli
 HAYTAP

References 

Istanbul
Mammals of Turkey
Cats in Turkey